Tarbek is a municipality in the district of Segeberg, in Schleswig-Holstein, Germany. It is part of the Amt Bornhöved.

References

Segeberg